FA1 or FA-1 may refer to :
 Arrows FA1, a racing car
 FA-1 (cable system), a fiber cable crossing the Atlantic
 Fresh Aire, the first album in the Fresh Aire album series
 ALCO FA-1, a diesel-electric locomotive
 Formula Acceleration 1, a formula racing series that started in 2014